Swinging Sounds is a jazz album by drummer Shelly Manne's group Shelly Manne & His Men, recorded in 1956 and released on the Contemporary label. Early releases of the album were labelled Vol 4, indicating it was the fourth volume of recordings released by the group.

Reception

In an AllMusic review by Scott Yanow, it is stated: "This early edition of Shelly Manne & His Men is a well-integrated unit".

Track listing
 "The Dart Game" (Charlie Mariano) - 3:09
 "Bea's Flat" (Russ Freeman) - 4:38
 "Pathenia" (Shelly Manne) - 4:41
 "Un Poco Loco" (Bud Powell) - 9:01
 "Bernie's Tune" (Bernie Miller) - 4:27 		
 "Doxy" (Sonny Rollins) - 6:41
 "Slan" (Mariano) - 4:51
 "A Gem from Tiffany" (Bill Holman) - 3:04

Personnel
Shelly Manne & His Men
Shelly Manne - drums
Stu Williamson - trumpet, valve trombone
Charlie Mariano - alto saxophone
Russ Freeman - piano
Leroy Vinnegar - bass

References

1956 albums
Contemporary Records albums
Shelly Manne albums